The Macroglossinae are a subfamily of Sphingidae moths in the order Lepidoptera. The subfamily is divided into three tribes: Dilophonotini, Macroglossini and Philampelini.

References

Sphingidae of the World Checklist, All-Leps Barcode of Life

 
Moth subfamilies